Capoir was a legendary king of the Britons as accounted by Geoffrey of Monmouth.  He was preceded by Pir and succeeded by his son Digueillus.

References

Legendary British kings